The Rolling Thunder Revue was a 1975–1976 concert tour by American singer-songwriter Bob Dylan with numerous musicians and collaborators. The purpose of the tour was to allow Dylan, who had now become a major recording artist and concert performer, to play in smaller auditoriums in less populated cities where he could be more intimate with his audiences.

Some of the performers on the tour were Joan Baez, Roger McGuinn, Joni Mitchell, Ronee Blakely and Ramblin' Jack Elliott. Bob Neuwirth assembled backing musicians from the recording sessions for Dylan's Desire album, including violinist Scarlet Rivera, bassist Rob Stoner, and drummer Howie Wyeth, plus Mick Ronson on guitar. The tour included 57 concerts in two legs—the first in the American northeast and Canada in the fall of 1975, and the second in the American South and southwest in the spring of 1976.

The release of Desire in January 1976 fell between the two legs of the tour, with many of the songs performed in the first leg taken from that yet-to-be released album. The tour was thoroughly documented through film, sound recording, and in print. A documentary about the tour, directed by Martin Scorsese, titled Rolling Thunder Revue: A Bob Dylan Story by Martin Scorsese, was released by Netflix and in select theaters in June 2019.

Origins
The idea behind the tour, Dylan said, was to "play for the people," the people who never get good seats at his larger concerts due to higher ticket cost and inconvenient locations. Dylan chose to play in smaller auditoriums because, he said, "the atmosphere in small halls is more conducive to what we do." His New York musician friend David Blue felt that Dylan clearly wanted to get back to being closer to his audience after becoming a major music star, saying, "Bob's just an ordinary fucking guy, a great songwriter who got swept up in this whole fame thing and was smart enough to know how to control it, who rode with it and was shrewd, damn shrewd. And now he's just paying everyone back with this tour. It's like a family scene."

Dylan named the tour after hearing the continuous sounds of thunder one day. He conceived the tour in the summer of 1975 while he was living in Greenwich Village, and began co-writing with his friend, Jacques Levy, with whom he wrote various songs, including "Hurricane".

In October 1975, soon after completing Desire, Dylan held rehearsals for his second tour in two years (following an eight-year hiatus) at New York City's midtown Studio Instrument Rentals space. Bassist Rob Stoner, drummer/pianist Howie Wyeth and violinist Scarlet Rivera were retained from the Desire sessions for the rehearsals. Joining them were T-Bone Burnett (electric guitar, piano), Steven Soles (acoustic guitar, electric guitar, backing vocals) and David Mansfield (dobro, mandolin, violin, pedal steel guitar). Although the trio had been dismissed during the Desire sessions in an attempt to focus the overall production, Dylan yielded to his original instincts and decided to rehire them for the tour.  Luther Rix (drums, percussion) was also added at an indeterminate point.

When rehearsals began, many of the musicians were apparently uninformed about plans for an upcoming tour. At the same time, Dylan was casually inviting others to join in with the band. According to Stoner, the group rehearsed "for like a day or two – it [was] not really so much a rehearsal as like a jam, tryin' to sort it out. Meanwhile, all these people who eventually became the Rolling Thunder Revue started dropping in. Joan Baez was showing up. Roger McGuinn was there. They were all there. We had no idea what the purpose for these jams was, except we were being invited to jam."

According to Lou Kemp, a friend of Dylan's who eventually organized the tour, the Rolling Thunder Revue "would go out at night and run into people, and we'd just invite them to come with us. We started out with a relatively small group of musicians and support people, and we ended up with a caravan." Uninterested in performing in a country/folk milieu, Patti Smith amicably declined Dylan's invitation. Bruce Springsteen also turned down an invitation "because he had plenty of touring commitments of his own and was on a roll" following the breakthrough success of Born to Run, released that August. However, Dylan did add one surprising element to the Rolling Thunder Revue when Mick Ronson agreed to join the tour. Ronson was the lead guitarist and arranger in David Bowie's former backing band, The Spiders from Mars.

Another musician invited on the tour was introduced to Dylan on October 22, when Dylan went to see David Blue perform at The Other End. It was there that he met Ronee Blakley, the actress/singer who had recently starred in Robert Altman's celebrated film Nashville. At the end of Blue's show, Blakley joined Dylan on-stage for a few songs, joined by poet Allen Ginsberg; afterwards, Dylan extended her an invitation to join the Rolling Thunder Revue. She initially declined due to prior commitments but eventually changed her mind and appeared at rehearsals two days later. She later recalled, "Oh I loved him, right away, just loved him. He was exactly what I thought he would be like. Funny and mysterious and shy and dear and vulnerable."

However, the same day Blakley showed up for rehearsal, Dylan returned to the recording studio to re-record "Hurricane" (due to legal concerns involving the song's original lyrics). Employing Blakley as a substitute for Emmylou Harris (who had prior engagements to attend to), Dylan quickly recut "Hurricane", the last recorded work done for Desire before its release in January 1976.

On October 23, 1975, owner Mike Porco's 61st birthday, Dylan and a group of friends took over Gerde's Folk City as the main show was ending. Dylan and Joan Baez sang "One Too Many Mornings", followed onstage by Ramblin' Jack Elliott, Eric Andersen, Patti Smith, Arlen Roth, Bette Midler, Buzzy Linhart, Phil Ochs and others. Dylan and his group brought in lights and cameras and filmed the session, which began well after midnight; a brief scene of Phil Ochs trying to tune Eric Andersen's guitar from open to regular tuning made it into Renaldo and Clara. A week later, on October 30, the Rolling Thunder Revue played its first concert.

Sometime in October, Dylan also contacted an old friend and filmmaker, Howard Alk. Dylan's ambitions apparently included a film of the tour, and Alk accepted Dylan's offer to shoot the film. When the tour rehearsals were still in progress, Alk reportedly began filming scenes in Greenwich Village for possible inclusion in the film.

Dylan contacted actor/playwright Sam Shepard, then considered to be a relatively obscure cult figure, to work as the film's screenwriter. He was closely associated with several figures in Dylan's circle, including Jacques Levy, who directed many of Shepard's 1960s Off-Off-Broadway plays; Patti Smith, who was Shepard's former lover and dramatic collaborator; and Allen Ginsberg, who had worked with Shepard on Robert Frank's Me and My Brother in 1969. Dylan asked Shepard if he had seen Marcel Carné's Les Enfants du Paradis or François Truffaut's Shoot the Piano Player, and told him that those were the kinds of films he wanted to produce on the tour.

While Ginsberg accompanied the tour for most of its 1975 run, his planned recitations, as well as some performances by other Revue members, were cut before the opening date to keep the concerts at a manageable length.

1975 fall tour

On October 30, Dylan held the first Rolling Thunder Revue show at the War Memorial Auditorium in Plymouth, Massachusetts. Intended to contrast with the bombast of his 1974 tour with The Band, the first leg of the tour was small, spanning only thirty shows. The majority of the first Revue was booked at intimate venues, including smaller arenas, theaters and gymnasia; aside from two shows in Upstate New York, a four-show Canadian leg and the concluding concerts in the New York metropolitan area, the tour's itinerary was entirely confined to New England. However, the secrecy surrounding the Revue's intended destinations, the new material Dylan was premiering, and the inclusion of Joan Baez on the same bill as Dylan for the first time in a decade ensured prominent media coverage.

On November 2, 1975, the tour stopped at the University of Lowell. Dylan's inspiration for playing Lowell was Jack Kerouac, a pivotal influence on his oeuvre who was born and raised in the city. Dylan, Beat Generation colleague Ginsberg and various band members visited Kerouac's gravesite.

According to Larry Sloman, who documented the tour in On the Road with Bob Dylan (1978), "Onstage it was like a carnival. Bobby Neuwirth and the back-up band [dubbed 'Guam'] warmed up the audience. Next, Dylan ambled on to do about five songs. After intermission, the curtain rose to an incredible sight, Bob and Joan, together again after all these years."

Dylan and Baez often opened the second half of the show duetting in the dark on "Blowin' in the Wind". Then Baez would take center stage with a dynamic six-song set, followed by a solo set from Dylan. He was joined by the band for a few numbers, until the finale song, Woody Guthrie's "This Land Is Your Land," featuring everyone on stage. The spirit was considered extremely warm, leading to Joni Mitchell, who only intended to play one concert, to stay on for the remaining three nights of the tour.

The dramatic finale of the tour took place on December 8 in Madison Square Garden, where, to an audience of 14,000, Dylan performed a benefit concert for imprisoned boxer and Dylan's latest cause, Rubin Carter. The concert was titled "The Night of The Hurricane," in reference to Dylan's song, "Hurricane", which was released in November 1975. Among those appearing on stage were Muhammad Ali and Coretta Scott King, wife of slain civil rights activist, Martin Luther King Jr.

Performers included Roberta Flack, Robbie Robertson, Ronee Blakely, Joan Baez, Joni Mitchell and violinist Scarlet Rivera. In the audience were a number of key political figures, boxers, and movie stars. And at the time of the concert, Carter was an inmate at Trenton State Prison, where he reacted after learning of the benefit on his behalf and the song dedicated to him: "Wow, man. I mean, he took this case, this nine years of whatever, and put it together, wop, like that, and covered every level, every facet of it. I said "Man, this cat's a genius. He's giving the people the truth." And it was inspiring to me. I told myself, "Rubin, you got to keep pushing, 'cause you must be doing something right, you got all these good people coming to try and help you."

Dylan made the surprising theatrical choice of wearing whiteface make-up at many of the shows. In some shows, he walked on stage wearing a plastic mask, only to toss it aside after the first song to play harmonica on "It Ain't Me, Babe." According to Rivera, one heckler asked Dylan "Why are you wearing a mask?" to which Dylan replied, "The meaning is in the words."

Critical responses and film
There is a critical consensus that the tour failed in one regard, the making of the film Renaldo and Clara. Shepard soon discovered that his nominal function as screenwriter was somewhat superfluous, for most of the film's dramatic sequences would be entirely improvised with little guidance or direction from Dylan. Shepard elected to record his impressionistic divagations in a journal eventually published as The Rolling Thunder Logbook (1977).

A number of critics highly praised the tour. "The Rolling Thunder Revue shows remain some of the finest music Dylan ever made with a live band", wrote Clinton Heylin. "Gone was the traditionalism of The Band. Instead he found a whole set of textures rarely found in rock. The idea of blending the pedal-steel syncopation of Mansfield, Ronson's glam-rock lead breaks, and Rivera's electric violin made for something as musically layered as Dylan's lyrics...[Dylan] also displayed a vocal precision rare even for him, snapping and stretching words to cajole nuances of meaning from each and every line." According to Riley, "These are rugged and inspired reworkings of many Dylan standards—[Dylan] even talks casually to the audience (now a thing of the past). He lights into a biting electric version of 'It Ain't Me, Babe,' and then a thoroughly convincing rock take of 'The Lonesome Death of Hattie Carroll'...and an 'Isis' that makes the Desire take sound like a greeting card."

1976 spring tour
A second Hurricane Carter benefit was held at the Astrodome in Houston, Texas on January 25, bridging the two legs of the tour. For this performance, Ringo Starr, Stephen Stills and Joe Vitale augmented the core band. Before the concert, Dylan chose to meet with the man that discovered him, Roy Silver, and Silver's partner, manager Richard Flanzer, for some advice. Flanzer and Silver quickly provided several stars (including Stevie Wonder and Dr. John) to help make this concert the most commercially successful event of the tour, with Dylan giving a strident performance. Dylan asked Flanzer to accompany him on the chartered flight to oversee these guest stars.

Rehearsals for the spring leg were held in Clearwater, Florida during April, and the first show was on April 18 at the Civic Center in Lakeland, Florida. With an itinerary dominated by arenas and stadiums due to the ballooning budget of Renaldo and Clara, the tour continued throughout April and May in the American South and Southwest. (Performances by Dylan and Baez during the Clearwater rehearsals were taped and aired on The Midnight Special.) Although most of the fall complement (including Baez, McGuinn, Ronson and the Neuwirth-led Guam) returned, Elliott, Blakley, Rix, Ginsberg and Shepard moved on to other endeavors. Kinky Friedman and Donna Weiss joined the ensemble as featured performers, essentially replacing the former two, while percussionist Gary Burke replaced Rix. New guests included Dennis Hopper, who recited Rudyard Kipling's "If" at The Warehouse in New Orleans. Joni Mitchell returned to preview two songs ("Black Crow" and "Song for Sharon") from Hejira in Fort Worth.

The penultimate show of the tour took place on May 23 at Hughes Stadium in Fort Collins, Colorado. Comments about it typified the feeling about the spring tour: "Although the band has been playing together longer, the charm has gone out of their exchanges", wrote Tim Riley. "The Rolling Thunder Revue, so joyful and electrifying in its first performances, had just plain run out of steam", wrote music critic Janet Maslin for Rolling Stone.

The final Rolling Thunder show took place in Utah on May 25, at Salt Palace in Salt Lake City.<ref name=Utah>Rock Artists Score Big in Salt Palace Show", The Salt Lake Tribune, May 26, 1976</ref> It was the first time Dylan had ever performed in Utah. News journalist David Beck, who came to the show, wrote that "in ensemble, they are, if anything, even better than alone. Put together by Dylan with rigid professionalism, the show is quick, well-paced, varied, funny and exciting. . . it was as good as you would expect it to be, with artists of this caliber; better, because of the time these people have spent together, because of their obvious admiration for one another, because of the unifying and uplifting presence of the Rolling Thunder band. Long may it roll.

The show in Utah would be Dylan's last performance for twenty-one months (save for a short set backed by The Band at The Last Waltz in November 1976), and it would be another two years before Dylan recorded another album of new material.

Legacy

The May 23 Colorado show was filmed for the September 1976 NBC television special Hard Rain; the Hard Rain live album containing selections from that and another late May date was released simultaneously. The television special garnered poor reviews and disappointing ratings, despite a TV Guide cover of and interview with Dylan. Sales of the album were relatively modest in the United States, where it peaked at No. 17.

Dylan and Shepard's completed film, now the symbolist-romance-cum-concert-film Renaldo and Clara, would not be released until 1978 to a largely negative critical reception. For many years, it was the only official release documenting the live shows from the fall 1975 leg. However, a majority of the film consisted of the haphazard, fictional drama filmed during the tour. Later in 1978, an edited version of the film appeared that omitted many of the dramatic scenes in favor of focusing more on the performances.

Most performances from the fall 1975 tour were professionally recorded (in addition to wide bootlegging). The Bootleg Series Vol. 5: Bob Dylan Live 1975, The Rolling Thunder Revue, incorporating performances from a number of the fall shows, saw issue in 2002. As the first official release to capture the Revue at its peak, it was warmly received by fans and critics. In August 2010, a source close to Dylan told Rolling Stone that a documentary about the Rolling Thunder tour had been in development for years and could be released relatively soon.

In June 2019, Netflix released a pseudo-documentary about the tour, directed by Martin Scorsese, titled Rolling Thunder Revue: A Bob Dylan Story by Martin Scorsese. According to Netflix, the film "captures the troubled spirit of America in 1975 and the joyous music that Dylan performed during the fall of that year. Part documentary, part concert film, part fever dream, 'Rolling Thunder' is a one of a kind experience, from master filmmaker Martin Scorsese."

Tour dates

Autumn leg

Carter benefit show

Spring leg

 Box office score data 

See alsoThe Bootleg Series Vol. 5: Bob Dylan Live 1975, The Rolling Thunder Revue (2002)Bob Dylan – The Rolling Thunder Revue: The 1975 Live Recordings'' (2019)

References

Sources

External links
 Bjorner's Still on the Road tour dates and set lists, 1975 leg
 Bjorner's Still on the Road tour dates and set lists, 1976 leg

Bob Dylan concert tours
1975 concert tours
1976 concert tours